Phạm Đan Trường (born 29 November 1976) is a Vietnamese male singer and actor. He is known for pop, dance and folk songs.

He has been a professional singer since 1997 and has been active for over 20 years, after winning 2nd prize at a talent show "The Voice of District 10", Ho Chi Minh City. In 1997, he signed an exclusive contract with HT Production and became known for Chinese music-Vietnamese lyric songs; the most popular one of them is "Kiep Ve Sau" and "Di Ve Noi Xa" of the same album that was released at the end of 1999. This song won him the Favorite Artist award of Green Wave Awards.

In 2000s, he released many albums that gained much commercial success: Bong Dang Thien Than (2000), Loi Ru Tinh (2001), Trai Tim Binh Yen - Dong Song Bang (2002), Giac Mo Mau Xanh (2003), Den 1 Luc Nao Do (2004), Thap Nhi My Nhan (2007). He is the first Vietnamese artist to buy exclusive copyrights of songs to build his image and music style. He is successful in many genres, including canto-pop, pop ballads, traditional and folk songs.

During his career, he has won many music awards. He is the first to receive Artist of The Year award and Favorite Artist award for seven times in a row from Green Wave Awards, 6 Golden Blossom Awards, Favorite Male Artist Award for 3 times in a row of HTV Awards before withdrawing. He also won other awards such as: Ngoi Sao Bach Kim (Platinum Star), VTV - Bai Hat Toi Yeu (VTV - My Favorite Song), Zing Music Awards,...as well as being nominated for Singer of The Year Award at Music Dedication Award. He is also the representative of Vietnam for Asian Pop Music Concert 2016 in Korea. He is also the coach and judge of many reality television shows, including Ngoi Sao Phuong Nam (Star of the South), Than Tuong Bolero (Bolero Idol), Tuyet Dinh Song Ca (Extreme Duet). He is also an actor and has starred in movies including Vo Lam Truyen Ky (2007), ...Thu Ba Hoc Tro (2009), Yeu Anh! Em Dam Khong? (2013). He was chosen as "Taiwan Tourism Representative" (2005) by Tourism Bureau of Taiwan and "Holland Tourism Ambassador of Vietnam" (2007).

He married Trịnh Thủy Tiên - a Vietnamese-American businesswoman (born 1986).

Discography

Live shows

Cảm ơn cuộc đời - 2000, 2001
Giữ mãi niềm tin - 2002
Trái tim bình yên - 2003
Mãi mãi một tình yêu - 2004
10 năm 1 chặng đường - 2006
Thập đại mỹ nhân - 2008
Ngôi sao bay - 2010
Đêm nhạc Thiên đường vắng - 2011
Kỷ niệm 15 năm ca hát - Con sóng yêu thương - 2012
Đêm nhạc Ngày và đêm - 2013
Vẫn mãi một nụ cười - 2014
Dấu Ấn - 2014
Kỷ niệm 20 năm ca hát - Cảm Ơn Đời - 2016

Studio albums

Vol.1 - Album nhạc tuyển Đan Trường (1999)
Vol.2 - Đi về nơi xa (1999)
Vol.3 - Bóng dáng thiên thần (2000)
Vol.4 - Best Collection (2000)
Vol.5 - The Best of Đan Trường (2001)
Vol.6 - Lời ru tình (2002)
Vol.7 - Best Collection (2002)
Vol.8 - Trái tim bình yên - Dòng sông băng (2003) 
Vol.9 - Giấc mơ màu xanh (2003) 
Vol.10 - The Best of Đan Trường - Đánh mất giấc mơ (2003)
Vol.11 - Đến một lúc nào đó (2004)
Vol.12 - Bông hồng cài áo  (2005) 
Vol.13 - Anh phải làm sao (2005)
Vol.14 - Thương thầm (2005)
Vol.15 - Lời nguyện cầu tình yêu (2006)
Vol.16 - Bài ca Mi Ya Hee (2006) 
Vol.17 - Đơn ca Đan Trường  - Anh vẫn đợi chờ (2007)
Vol.17 - Song ca Đan Trường - Thập nhị mỹ nhân (2007)
Vol.18 - Dây đủng đỉnh buồn (2008)
Vol.19 - Thiên sứ tình yêu (2008) 
Vol.20 - Ngôi sao bay (2009)
Vol.21 - Ướt lem chữ đời (2009)
Vol.22 - Người Miền Tây (2010)
Vol.23 - Thiên Đường Vắng (2010)
Vol.24 - Lỡ duyên rồi (2011)
Vol.25 - Tuyết mùa hè (2011)
Vol.26 - Thư pháp (2012)
Vol.27 - Người Hai Quê (2012)
Vol.28 - Ngày và Đêm (2013)
Vol.29 - Lục Tỉnh Miền Tây (2013)
Vol 30 - Người Thay Thế (2014)
Vol 31 - Nhìn Vào Nỗi Nhớ - Chàng Ốc Tương Tư (2015)
Vol 32 - Nồi Đất (2015)
Vol 33 - Yêu Nhau Bao Lâu (2016)

Singles

Trái tim bình yên (2002)
Gửi lại mùa xuân (2002)
Trương Chi Mỵ Nương (2004)
Ở nơi đó em cười (2006)
Một ngày đi qua - The Best of Lê Quang (2007)
The Best of Remix (2007)
Hùng thiêng Âu Lạc (2010)
Album Đan Trường - Lời Tiên Tri - Single (2014)
Album Đan Trường - Hết Hy Vọng - Single (2015)

Filmography

Vua hóa cò
Hoàng tử chăn lợn
Võ lâm truyền kỳ
Thứ ba học trò
Nụ hôn đầu xuân
Yêu anh! Em dám không?
Cha ma
Ngốc ơi tuổi 17

See also

List of Vietnamese people
Music of Vietnam

References

External links
Official website

1976 births
20th-century Vietnamese male singers
21st-century Vietnamese male singers
Living people
People from Ho Chi Minh City
Vietnamese idols
Vietnamese pop singers
Vietnamese Roman Catholics